This is a list of those members of the Russian Imperial House who bore the title velikaia kniaginia or velikaia knazhna (usually translated into French and English as grand duchess, but more accurately grand princess). This courtesy title was borne (usually) by daughters and male-line granddaughters of the emperors and empresses of Russia, as well as by wives of grand dukes of Russia, all along with the style of Her Imperial Highness.

Grand duchesses of Russia

After 1917 no such daughter was born into the deposed imperial house who would have been entitled to the title grand duchess - i.e., had been a male-line granddaughter of a reigning emperor; although such would have been technically possible, as there lived sons of reigning emperors and their daughters would have been so entitled

Grand Duchesses of Russia by marriage

Although male grand dukes of Russia (sons or male-line grandsons of reigning emperors) existed after 1917, when the imperial house was deposed, none of them contracted an equal marriage after that date; so the title grand duchess was not gained by marriage thereafter — though it would have been technically possible.

Note that a grand duke or grand duchess as a translation is not necessarily associated with a grand duchy; see the relevant articles for more information.

A Russian grand duchess was styled as Her Imperial Highness. With the exception of Charlotte-Christine, women marrying into the Imperial family converted to Russian Orthodoxy (except for the Montenegrin and Greek princesses, who were already Orthodox). They also took Russian names — of the 17 converts: four took patronyms using their fathers' names, eight took Fyodorovna (after the Feodorovskaya Icon of the Mother of God), three took Alexeievna, one Alexandrovna (her husband's name) and one Pavlovna (her husband's patronym, the late Paul I); eight also changed their own given name.

See also
List of Grand Dukes of Russia

Russia
 
Grand Duchesses
Russia
Grand Duchesses